Schnyder crystalline corneal dystrophy (SCD) is a rare form of corneal dystrophy. It is caused by heterozygous mutations in UBIAD1 gene. Cells in the cornea accumulate cholesterol and phosopholipid deposits leading to the opacity, in severe cases requiring corneal transplants. Abnormal cholesterol metabolism has been noted in other cell types of affected patients (skin fibroblasts) suggesting that this may be a systemic disorder with clinical manifestations limited to the cornea.

Notes

External links 

Disorders of sclera and cornea